Municipal elections were held in the Canadian province of British Columbia on November 15, 2014. Races were held in all municipalities and regional district electoral areas.

Incumbents marked with "(X)".

Selected mayoral races were as follows:

Abbotsford

Mayoral election

Abbotsford City Council election
Top 8 candidates elected

Burnaby

Mayoral election

Burnaby City Council election
Top 8 candidates elected

Campbell River

Mayoral election

Chilliwack

Mayoral election

Chilliwack City Council election
Top 6 candidates elected

Coquitlam

Mayoral election

Coquitlam City Council election
Top 8 candidates elected

Delta

Mayoral election

Delta District Council election
Top 6 candidates elected

Kamloops

Mayoral election

Kamloops City Council election
Top 8 candidates elected

Mayoral and city council by-elections
Held on September 30, 2017 to replace mayor Milobar who was elected to the British Columbia legislature. Council by-elections were held to replace Ken Christian who was running for mayor and Marg Spina, who is battling breast cancer.

Kelowna

Mayoral election

Kelowna City Council election
Top 8 candidates elected

Langford

Mayoral election

Langley Township

Mayoral election

Langley District Council election
Top 8 candidates elected

Maple Ridge

Mayor

Maple Ridge District Council election
Top 6 candidates elected

Mission

Mayoral election

Mission District Council election
Top 6 candidates elected

Nanaimo

Mayoral election

Nanaimo City Council election
Top 8 candidates elected

City council by-election 
Held on July 8, 2017 to replace councillor Wendy Pratt.

New Westminster

Mayoral election

New Westminster City Council election
Top 6 candidates elected

North Cowichan

North Vancouver City

North Vancouver City Council election
Top 6 candidates elected

North Vancouver District

Mayoral election

North Vancouver District Council election
Top 6 candidates elected

Oak Bay

Penticton

Mayoral election

Pitt Meadows

Port Coquitlam

Mayoral election

Port Coquitlam City Council election
Top 6 candidates elected

Port Moody

Mayoral election

Prince George

Mayoral election

Prince George City Council election
Top 8 candidates elected

Quesnel

Richmond

Mayoral election

Richmond City Council election
Top 8 candidates elected

Saanich

Mayoral election

Saanich District Council election
Top 8 candidates elected

City council by-election
Held on September 23, 2017 to replace councillor Vic Derman who had died.

Smithers

Surrey

Mayoral election

Surrey City Council election
Top 8 candidates elected

Tofino

Vancouver

Vernon

Mayoral election

Vernon City Council election
Top 6 candidates elected

Victoria

Mayoral election

Victoria City Council election
Top 8 candidates elected

West Kelowna

Mayoral election

West Vancouver

West Vancouver District Council election
Top 6 candidates elected

References

CivicInfoBC

2014 elections in Canada
Municipal elections in British Columbia
2014 in British Columbia